Stylocline psilocarphoides is a species of flowering plant in the family Asteraceae known by the common names baretwig neststraw and Peck's neststraw. It is native to the western United States from Idaho to southeastern California, where it grows in deserts and other dry, sandy, gravelly habitat. It is a small annual herb growing at ground level with stems measuring 1 to 18 centimeters in length. It is woolly or felt-like in texture with a coating of white hairs. The pointed leaves are up to 1.8 centimeters long and alternately arranged. The inflorescence bears oval flower heads no more than half a centimeter in diameter. The head generally has no phyllaries, or has small ones that fall away early. It is a hardened ball of several woolly white flowers.

References

External links
Calflora: Stylocline psilocarphoides
Jepson Manual Treatment
Flora of North America
UC CalPhotos gallery

psilocarphoides
Flora of the California desert regions
Flora of the Great Basin
Flora of Idaho
Flora of Nevada
Flora of Oregon
Flora of Utah
Endemic flora of the United States
Natural history of the Mojave Desert
Flora without expected TNC conservation status